Motte Aldeberg is a motte in Germany. Often called only Alde Berg, it is located in the Helpensteiner Bachtal between the communities of Arsbeck and Rödgen in the town of Wegberg in the Heinsberg district in North Rhine-Westphalia.

Heinsberg (district)
Motte-and-bailey castles
Castles in North Rhine-Westphalia